Streptomyces klenkii is a bacterium species from the genus of Streptomyces which has been isolated from deep marine sediments from the Black Sea near the Ordu Province in Turkey.

See also 
 List of Streptomyces species

References

Further reading

External links
Type strain of Streptomyces klenkii at BacDive -  the Bacterial Diversity Metadatabase	

klenkii
Bacteria described in 2015